John Fredrik Michael Pettersson (born June 10, 1987) is a Swedish former professional ice hockey right winger. He last played for the ZSC Lions in the National League (NL). He previously played for Torpedo Nizhny Novgorod and HC Donbass in the Kontinental Hockey League, HC Lugano in the National League (NL) and Frölunda HC in Sweden. He played with the Swedish national team on several occasions and was a member of gold and bronze medal winning squads at the World Hockey Championship.

Playing career

Junior
A native of Gothenburg, Sweden, Pettersson played junior hockey in his hometown for Frölunda HC's Under-18 and J20 SuperElit teams between 2002 and 2005. Pettersson described himself as being an "energy player", using his skating ability and hard work to help his team. He was a member of Frölunda teams that won the J18 gold medal in 2003, 2004 and 2005, and also won gold with the J20 team in 2005.

The Edmonton Oilers selected Pettersson in the fifth round of the 2005 National Hockey League (NHL) Entry Draft, 157th overall. He chose to complete his junior career in North America. He joined the Western Hockey League (WHL)'s Calgary Hitmen, who selected him with the 48th pick in the 2005 Canadian Hockey League import draft. Pettersson adapted quickly; he scored 10 goals and 17 points in his first 19 WHL games, en route to a 22-goal, 43-point season in 2005–06. He improved to 50 points in 2006–07, but after the Oilers declined to sign him to an NHL contract, Pettersson returned to Sweden to begin his professional career.

Professional
Pettersson returned to Frölunda HC on a one-year contract for the 2007–08 Elitserien season. He made his professional debut and scored his first goal on September 24, 2007, against HV71. A 13 point rookie season earned Pettersson a contract extension, and he doubled his offensive output to 26 points in 2008–09. He scored 20 goals and improved to 38 points in 58 games in 2009–10. After playing only 7–10 minutes per game in his first season, his improvements saw him playing as much as 25 minutes per night by his third.  He caught the attention of the Atlanta Thrashers, who convinced Pettersson to return to North America and take a second chance at making the NHL and signed him to a contract. He failed to make the Thrashers' roster, and was assigned to their American Hockey League (AHL) affiliate, the Chicago Wolves for the 2010–11 season. He scored 11 goals and 32 points in 67 games for Chicago before again returning to Frölunda.

Pettersson recorded a career high 40 points in his return season with Frölunda in 2011–12 before moving to the Kontinental Hockey League (KHL), signing with Ukrainian club HC Donbass for its inaugural season in Europe's top hockey league. Appearing in 47 games with Donbass in 2012–13, Pettersson scored 7 goals and added 6 assists.

He signed with HC Lugano of Switzerland’s top-flight NLA in November 2013. In 2014-15, his first full season with Lugano, Pettersson produced 33 goals and 36 assists in 49 games to lead the league in scoring. He received NLA Forward of the Year honors that season.

He started the 2016-17 season with Torpedo Nizhny Novgorod of the Kontinental Hockey League and transferred to fellow KHL side Dinamo Minsk in December 2016.

International play

As a junior, Pettersson made three appearances with the Swedish under-20 team. He was a member of the under-18 squad that won the bronze medal at the 2005 IIHF World U18 Championships, and helped guide the Swedes to fifth and fourth place finishes in the 2006 and 2007 World Junior Hockey Championships. Pettersson made his first senior world championship appearance with the Swedish national team in 2010. He had two points in seven games for the bronze medal-winning Swedes.

He returned for the 2013 World Championship where he scored seven points in nine games. The Swedes defeated Switzerland, 5–1, in the final at Stockholm to become the first nation in 27 years to win the gold medal in their home country.

Career statistics

Regular season and playoffs

International

References

External links
 

1987 births
Living people
Calgary Hitmen players
Chicago Wolves players
HC Dinamo Minsk players
HC Donbass players
Edmonton Oilers draft picks
Frölunda HC players
HC Lugano players
Ice hockey players at the 2018 Winter Olympics
Olympic ice hockey players of Sweden
Swedish ice hockey right wingers
Torpedo Nizhny Novgorod players
ZSC Lions players
Ice hockey people from Gothenburg